Nirmal Roy (in Urdu نرمل رائے) (born August 6, 1996) is a Pakistani singer. Born in Lahore, she started her career at the age of twelve. Roy has performed and won many music competitions on national level, including the Voice of Kinnaird College in 2014. In 2016, she made her Coke Studio debut as a featured artist in the ninth season, with the song "Ala Bali", along with Jabar Abbas, as a part of team Sheraz Uppal. Upon release, the song as well as Roy's singing style was praised. In 2015 she was again selected to take part in Coke Studio along with Ali Hamza for the track "Jindaani" . She was also selected to do playback for the Pakistani film Punjab Nahi Jaungi for the track "Raunaq-E-Ashiqui".

In 2018 she signed a contract with International Management Agency Stardreamz Global Entertainment.

Personal life
Roy belongs to a Christian family.

Discography

Awards and nominations
Nominated for Best Singer Female for "Raunaq-e-Aashiqui" at 17th Lux Style Awards

References

External links
 
 Nirmal Roy at Coke Studio 

Living people
Pakistani Christians
Performers of Sufi music
Pakistani musicians
1996 births
21st-century Pakistani women singers